Dalton is a city and the county seat of Whitfield County, Georgia, United States. It is also the principal city of the Dalton Metropolitan Statistical Area, which encompasses all of Murray and Whitfield counties.

As of the 2010 census, the city had a population of 33,128 people, with the total metropolitan area having a population of 142,227. Dalton is located just off Interstate 75 in the foothills of the Blue Ridge Mountains in northwest Georgia and is the second-largest city in northwest Georgia, after Rome.

Dalton is home to many of the nation's floor-covering manufacturers, primarily those producing carpet, rugs, and vinyl flooring. It is home to the Dalton Convention Center, which showcases the Georgia Athletic Coaches' Hall of Fame and hosts a variety of events.

Geography

Dalton is located at (34.771088, -84.971553).

Demographics

2020 census

As of the 2020 United States census, there were 34,417 people, 11,305 households, and 7,470 families residing in the city.

2010 census
According to the 2010 census Dalton had a population of 33,128 living in 11,337 households.  The racial and ethnic composition of the population was 42.4% non-Hispanic white, 22.6% Hispanic, 6.4% black, 0.6% Native American, 2.4% Asian, 0.1% Pacific Islander, 0.1% non-Hispanic reporting some other race, 22.2% Hispanic reporting some other race and 3.2% reporting two or more races.  48.0% of the population was Hispanic or Latino.

2000 census
According to the census estimate of 2006, there were 33,604 people, 10,689 households, and 8,511 families residing in the city. The racial makeup of the city was 20% White, 22% Black (U.S. Census), 1% Native American, 1% Asian, 1% Pacific Islander, 21.15% from other races, and 6% from two or more races. Hispanic or Latino of any race were 50% of the population.

There were 9,689 households, out of which 34.3% had children under the age of 18 living with them, 49.9% were married couples living together, 11.5% had a female householder with no husband present, and 32.8% were non-families. 27.6% of all households were made up of individuals, and 10.8% had someone living alone who was 65 years of age or older.  The average household size was 2.81, and the average family size was 3.43.

In the city, the population was spread out, with 27.3% under the age of 18, 12.0% from 18 to 24, 30.3% from 25 to 44, 18.9% from 45 to 64, and 11.5% who were 65 years of age or older.  The median age was 31 years. For every 100 females, there were 104.0 males.  For every 100 females age 18 and over, there were 101.6 males.

The median income for a household in the city was $34,312, and the median income for a family was $41,111. Males had a median income of $28,158 versus $23,701 for females. The per capita income for the city was $20,575.  About 11.9% of families and 16.0% of the population were below the poverty line, including 19.0% of those under age 18 and 8.9% of those aged 65 or over. After the lay-offs companies like Mohawk Industries paid workers with twenty years seniority a "small severance package." Unlike other developed countries, the United States lags behind significantly "in providing support for families who lose their jobs."

Mexican Americans
In the 1990s, Mexicans began to immigrate to Dalton to work at carpet factories. By 2010, 48% of Dalton's 33,000 residents were Latino, comprising a plurality of all residents. During the late 1980s economic boom – when demand for carpet mill laborers reached an all-time high – the 320 carpet mills aggressively recruited Latino workers. As of 2012, Hispanics constituted the plurality of students at Dalton High School.

Climate
Dalton has a humid subtropical climate (Cfa), with hot, humid summers, and mild to cool winters, and straddles the border between USDA Hardiness Zones 7B and 8A.

Arts and culture

Creative Arts Guild
The Creative Arts Guild is the oldest multi-disciplinary community arts center in the state of Georgia. Founded in 1963 by a group of civic leaders, the Creative Arts Guild began as a grass-roots community movement originally housed in the Old Firehouse on Pentz Street in historic Downtown Dalton. The Guild began offering art, music, dance and theatre classes as well as gallery shows and exhibitions. As programming and class attendance grew, plans for a larger facility were developed. In 1981, the Guild moved to its permanent home at 520 West Waugh Street. The vision of that small group of patrons has grown into an organization that now houses four educational departments (visual art, dance, gymnastics, and music) as well as the Arts in Education outreach programs, events, gallery exhibits, music and dance concerts and recitals and acts as a hub of culture for North West Georgia and South East Tennessee.

Artistic Civic Theatre 
Artistic Civic Theatre has served the Northwest Georgia community for twenty-four years, and has reached thousands of citizens through major musical, comedy, and drama productions, ACT2 (the children's wing), student productions in cooperation with schools in Dalton, Whitfield, and Murray counties, touring productions of original adaptations of classic fairy tales, theatrical arts classes co-sponsored with the Creative Arts Guild, the annual Youth Theatre Camp,  and the Studio Cabaret live music series.  ACT's programs are funded through individual and family memberships, as well as corporate sponsorships and donations.  Consider becoming a member or corporate sponsor and help us continue to provide theatrical arts opportunities, entertainment, and educational programs to the Northwest Georgia Community.

Dalton Little Theatre 
Dalton Little Theatre held its first documented performance in 1869. The organization began as the Dalton Amateurs and continued as the Sophoclean Dramatic Club, and the Dalton Players, before becoming Dalton Little Theatre in 1955. The theatre has performed continuously except for breaks during World War I and World War II. The organization formally incorporated in 1958 and found its first home in 1981 when it converted the former firehouse built in 1888 into the Firehouse Theatre. The Firehouse Theatre is often referred to as the Old Dalton Firehouse, and it remains the home of Dalton Little Theatre to this day.

Other events 
The Downtown Dalton Development Authority hosts a number of events throughout the year, including the Downtown Dalton Farmers Market (May–August), a Downtown Sampler, and an annual Beer Festival. The Dalton Area Convention & Visitors Bureau partners with the DDDA to host the Downtown Dalton Summer Concert Series, featuring local bands. The Young Professionals of Northwest Georgia host a monthly social event to connect and engage area young professionals

History

Pre- history 
Woodland Indians and Creek Nation initially held the area of present-day Dalton, Georgia. The first recorded white man in the area, was Spanish explorer Hernando de Soto (1540). By the mid-18th century, when the Cherokee forced the Creek Nation out of their homelands, to the west and south. The Cherokee Indians called the mountains of north Georgia their "Enchanted Land" until their own forced removal in 1838.

Industrialization 
By the time the last Cherokees were removed from the land, work was underway for a railroad, the Western and Atlantic Railroad (W&A), to join the Tennessee River with the Georgia Railroad then under construction. In 1847, Dalton was defined as a mile radius from the city center, the Western and Atlantic Depot. The final segment of this pivotal railway was completed in Tunnel Hill, Whitfield County in 1850. A second railroad, East Tennessee and Georgia, was completed in 1852.

Catherine Evans Whitener's revitalization of the pre-Civil War-era craft of candlewicking gave rise to a cottage chenille bedspread industry. Homes along U.S. Highway 41 displayed brightly patterned homemade bedspreads on front yard clotheslines in hopes of luring tourists into a purchase. The stretch of highway passing through Whitfield County became known colloquially as "Peacock Alley" in reference to one of the most common patterns depicted on the bedspreads. The bedspread business boomed to a multimillion-dollar industry by the 1950s, and from this early origin, the carpet tufting industry grew in Dalton after Glenn Looper developed an adaptation that allowed the mechanism used to tuft yarn into muslin or cotton for bedspreads to tuft into jute, shifting the nation's carpet manufacturers from woven wool products in the northeast to tufted synthetic carpets in northwest Georgia. Today, carpet mills remain the region's major employers and economic drivers.

Dalton was named for Tristram Dalton of Massachusetts.

Civil War

During the Civil War, the city of Dalton saw its first action during the Great Locomotive Chase, on April 12, 1862. More than a year later, on September 18–20, 1863, massive Union and Confederate forces battled a few miles west of Dalton at the Battle of Chickamauga, and later during the Chattanooga campaign. The war came to Whitfield County in the spring of 1864. The First Battle of Dalton included the battle of Rocky Face Ridge and Dug Gap began on May 7, 1864, and ended when General Johnston completed his withdrawal from Dalton on May 12. The Second Battle of Dalton occurred August 14–15, 1864.

In John Bell Hood's Tennessee campaign, Joseph Wheeler's cavalry attacked a Union blockhouse in Tilton before passing through Dalton and heading west.

The U.S. government recently declared Dalton and Whitfield County to have more intact Civil War artifacts than any other place in the country. Also of interest is the site of the historic Western & Atlantic Railroad Station; one of the few still standing and restored to its original architectural state, this site used to be the location of the Dalton Depot Restaurant (closed since 2015). The steel center marker for the original surveying of the city of Dalton is still inside the depot.

Modern history 
The A. D. Strickland Store was once a rural county store, built c. 1878, and is now part of the National Register of Historic Places.

Carpet industry
Dalton is often referred to as the "Carpet Capital of the World," home to over 150 carpet plants. The industry employs more than 30,000 people in the Whitfield County area. More than 90% of the functional carpet produced in the world today is made within a  radius of the city.

The agglomeration of the carpet industry in Dalton can be traced back to a wedding gift given in 1895 by a teenage girl, Catherine Evans Whitener, to her brother, Henry Alexander Evans, and his bride, Elizabeth Cramer. The gift was an unusual tufted bedspread.  Copying a quilt pattern, she sewed thick cotton yarns with a running stitch into unbleached muslin, clipped the ends of the yarn so they would fluff out, and finally, washed the spread in hot water to hold the yarns by shrinking the fabric. Interest grew in young Catherine's bedspreads, and in 1900, she made the first sale of a spread for $2.50. Demand for the spreads became so great that by the 1930s, local women had "haulers," who would take the stamped sheeting and yarns to front porch workers.  Often entire families worked to hand-tuft the spreads for 10 to 25 cents per spread.  Nearly 10,000 area cottage "tufters," men, women, and children were involved in the industry.  Income generated by the bedspreads was instrumental in helping many area families survive the Depression. Chenille bedspreads became popular all over the country and provided a new name for Dalton: the Bedspread Capital of the World.

When a form of mechanized carpet making was developed after World War II, Dalton became the center of the new industry because specialized tufting skills were required and the city had a ready pool of workers with those skills.

By the 1970s manufacturers had begun to develop techniques to move from plain tufted carpet to sculpted carpet. Improved patterning, stain and wear resistance, and colors have made the modern tufted carpet the choice for functional carpet for the vast majority of homes and moved woven carpet to a decorative role.

By the 1990s carpet scraps had made up 60% of the area's waste, and a balefill site called the Carpet Landfill was created to accommodate the unique issue. It currently stores over 500,000 tons of baled carpet.

From June 2011 to June 2012 as carpet mills that had employed thousands restructured, downsized, cut back productivity and closed, Dalton lost 4,600 jobs—according to the U.S. Labor Department—making it the city with the worst job loss in the United States.

The city's unemployment rate has since dipped to as low as 5.5%.

Government and politics

Election results

Environmental problems
Dalton's carpet production has taken up to one-third of the Conasauga River summer water flow. The river and city water supply has been contaminated with perfluorinated compounds used to make carpets stain-resistant. Dalton Utilities' has processed wastewater using a land application system, that spread effluent on more than nine thousand forested acres in an area called Looper's Bend. Runoff was found to drip down into the river.

Education

Public schools
The Dalton City School District, which covers the entire city of Dalton, holds pre-school to grade twelve, and consists of six elementary schools, a middle school, a high school, and an alternative school. The district has 366 full-time teachers and over 5,739 students.

The Whitfield County School District serves areas outside of the Dalton city limits, even if they have "Dalton, GA" postal addresses. Coahulla Creek High School, Phoenix High School, and Southeast Whitfield High School have Dalton postal addresses but lie outside of the city limits and serve areas not in the city limits.

Charter schools
Whitfield County Career Academy

Alternative schools
 Fort Hill Complex (Crossroads Academy)

Independent schools
 Christian Heritage School

Higher education

Infrastructure

Air
Dalton Municipal Airport, a general aviation airport, lacking scheduled commercial flights, is southeast of the city. International airports are in Chattanooga to the north and Atlanta to the south.

Rail
The Southern Railway had two Cincinnati to Florida named trains, Ponce de Leon (Cincinnati to Florida via Lexington, Chattanooga and Atlanta) and Royal Palm (Cincinnati to Florida via Lexington, Chattanooga and Atlanta) that made stops in the town into the 1960s. The Louisville and Nashville Railroad's Dixie Flagler (Chicago and St. Louis to Florida), Dixie Flyer (Chicago and St. Louis to Florida) and Georgian (Chicago and St. Louis to Atlanta) also made stops in Dalton. The last train was an unnamed L&N Evansville, Indiana - Atlanta, Georgia remnant of the Georgian, ending service on April 30, 1971.

Roads
Interstate 75 runs a short distance west of the city. The modern U.S. Route 41 and U.S. Route 76 circumvent Dalton, but historically they ran through the city. Georgia State Route 52 runs through the city's downtown.

Notable people

 Andy Foster, California State Athletic Commissioner.
 Morris Almond, professional basketball player
 Mitchell Boggs, former professional baseball player
 Lane Davies, American actor
 Susan Dennard, author of The Witchlands series
 Eddie Dwight, baseball player in the Negro leagues
 Stephen E. Gordy, Virginia politician
 Will N. Harben, Author
 Tammy Jo Kirk, NASCAR driver
 Robert Loveman, poet
 Marla Maples, actress and former wife of Donald Trump (native of nearby Cohutta)
 Harlan Erwin Mitchell, United States representative from Georgia
 Deborah Norville, television anchor and journalist
 Steve Prohm, head men's basketball coach at Iowa State University
 Harry Leon "Suitcase" Simpson, African American major league baseball player
 Dale Singleton, motorcycle racer
 Linda Vaughn, Miss Hurst Shifter

Sister cities
 Dilbeek, Belgium

See also 

 National Register of Historic Places listings in Whitfield County, Georgia

References

External links

 City of Dalton
 Roadside Georgia: Dalton  History of Dalton, Georgia
 Dalton Convention and Visitors Bureau Information on the history of Dalton and the carpet industry, attractions, events, restaurants and places to stay
 Dalton-Whitfield Chamber of Commerce

 
Cities in Georgia (U.S. state)
Cities in Whitfield County, Georgia
County seats in Georgia (U.S. state)
Dalton metropolitan area, Georgia